Giorgio Di Vicino (born 16 July 1980) is an Italian professional footballer who plays as a midfielder for Melfi.

References

External links
Giorgio Di Vicino at Footballdatabase

1980 births
Living people
Italian footballers
S.S.C. Napoli players
Serie A players
Serie B players
S.F. Aversa Normanna players
JK Sillamäe Kalev players
S.S. Ischia Isolaverde players
Association football midfielders
Expatriate footballers in Estonia